The following is a partial list of the "B" codes for Medical Subject Headings (MeSH), as defined by the United States National Library of Medicine (NLM).

This list continues the information at List of MeSH codes (A17). Codes following these are found at List of MeSH codes (B02). For other MeSH codes, see List of MeSH codes.

The source for this content is the set of 2006 MeSH Trees from the NLM.

– animals

– animal population groups

– animals, domestic

– animals, inbred strains
  – animals, congenic
  – mice, congenic
  – mice, inbred strains
  – mice, inbred a
  – mice, inbred akr
  – mice, inbred balb c
  – mice, inbred c3h
  – mice, inbred c57bl
  – mice, inbred mdx
  – mice, inbred cba
  – mice, inbred cftr
  – mice, inbred dba
  – mice, inbred hrs
  – mice, inbred icr
  – mice, inbred mrl lpr
  – mice, inbred nod
  – mice, inbred nzb
  – mice, inbred sencar
  – rats, inbred strains
  – rats, inbred aci
  – rats, inbred bb
  – rats, inbred bn
  – rats, inbred buf
  – rats, inbred dahl
  – rats, inbred f344
  – rats, inbred lec
  – rats, inbred lew
  – rats, inbred oletf
  – rats, inbred shr
  – rats, inbred wf
  – rats, inbred wky

– animals, laboratory
  – animals, congenic
  – mice, congenic
  – animals, inbred strains
  – animals, congenic
  – mice, congenic
  – mice, inbred strains
  – mice, inbred a
  – mice, inbred akr
  – mice, inbred balb c
  – mice, inbred c3h
  – mice, inbred c57bl
  – mice, inbred mdx
  – mice, inbred cba
  – mice, inbred cftr
  – mice, inbred dba
  – mice, inbred hrs
  – mice, inbred icr
  – mice, inbred mrl lpr
  – mice, inbred nod
  – mice, inbred nzb
  – mice, inbred sencar
  – rats, inbred strains
  – rats, inbred aci
  – rats, inbred bb
  – rats, inbred bn
  – rats, inbred buf
  – rats, inbred dahl
  – rats, inbred f344
  – rats, inbred lec
  – rats, inbred lew
  – rats, inbred oletf
  – rats, inbred shr
  – rats, inbred wf
  – rats, inbred wky

– animals, newborn

– animals, outbred strains

– animals, poisonous
  – fishes, poisonous

– animals, suckling

– animals, wild

– animals, zoo

– chimera
  – transplantation chimera
  – radiation chimera

– organisms, genetically modified
  – animals, genetically modified
  – mice, transgenic
  – mice, knockout

– chordata

– chordata, nonvertebrate
  – hyperotreti
  – hagfishes
  – urochordata
  – ciona intestinalis

– vertebrates
  – amphibia
  – anura
  – bufonidae
  – bufo arenarum
  – bufo bufo
  – bufo marinus
  – pipidae
  – xenopus
  – xenopus laevis
  – ranidae
  – rana catesbeiana
  – rana esculenta
  – rana pipiens
  – rana ridibunda
  – rana temporaria
  – urodela
  – ambystomatidae
  – ambystoma
  – ambystoma mexicanum
  – proteidae
  – necturus
  – necturus maculosus
  – salamandridae
  – notophthalmus
  – notophthalmus viridescens
  – pleurodeles
  – salamandra
  – triturus
  – birds
  – anseriformes
  – ducks
  – geese
  – charadriiformes
  – columbiformes
  – columbidae
  – falconiformes
  – eagles
  – hawks
  – galliformes
  – chickens
  – quail
  – colinus
  – coturnix
  – turkeys
  – palaeognathae
  – dromaiidae
  – rheiformes
  – struthioniformes
  – poultry
  – chickens
  – ducks
  – geese
  – turkeys
  – passeriformes
  – songbirds
  – crows
  – finches
  – canaries
  – sparrows
  – starlings
  – swallows
  – psittaciformes
  – cockatoos
  – parrots
  – agapornis
  – amazona
  – parakeets
  – melopsittacus
  – psittacula
  – raptors
  – falconiformes
  – eagles
  – hawks
  – strigiformes
  – spheniscidae
  – strigiformes
  – fishes
  – batrachoidiformes
  – catfishes
  – ictaluridae
  – cypriniformes
  – cyprinidae
  – carps
  – goldfish
  – zebrafish
  – eels
  – freshwater eels
  – elasmobranchii
  – sharks
  – dogfish
  – squalus
  – squalus acanthias
  – skates (fish)
  – torpedo
  – electric fish
  – gymnotiformes
  – electrophorus
  – skates (fish)
  – torpedo
  – esociformes
  – esocidae
  – umbridae
  – fishes, poisonous
  – flatfishes
  – flounder
  – gadiformes
  – gadus morhua
  – hagfishes
  – lampreys
  – petromyzon
  – osmeriformes
  – perciformes
  – bass
  – cichlids
  – tilapia
  – perches
  – sea bream
  – tuna
  – salmoniformes
  – salmonidae
  – salmon
  – oncorhynchus
  – oncorhynchus keta
  – oncorhynchus kisutch
  – salmo salar
  – trout
  – oncorhynchus
  – oncorhynchus mykiss
  – smegmamorpha
  – beloniformes
  – oryzias
  – cyprinodontiformes
  – fundulidae
  – killifishes
  – poecilia
  – tetraodontiformes
  – takifugu
  – mammals
  – artiodactyla
  – ruminants
  – antelopes
  – bison
  – buffaloes
  – camelids, new world
  – camels
  – cattle
  – deer
  – muntjacs
  – reindeer
  – goats
  – rupicapra
  – sheep
  – sheep, bighorn
  – sheep, domestic
  – swine
  – sus scrofa
  – swine, miniature
  – carnivora
  – canidae
  – coyotes
  – dogs
  – foxes
  – jackals
  – raccoon dogs
  – wolves
  – felidae
  – acinonyx
  – felis
  – cats
  – lynx
  – panthera
  – lions
  – tigers
  – puma
  – herpestidae
  – hyaenidae
  – mephitidae
  – mustelidae
  – ferrets
  – mink
  – otters
  – pinnipedia
  – fur seals
  – sea lions
  – seals, earless
  – phoca
  – walruses
  – procyonidae
  – raccoons
  – ursidae
  – viverridae
  – cetacea
  – dolphins
  – bottle-nosed dolphin
  – common dolphins
  – stenella
  – whale, killer
  – whales, pilot
  – porpoises
  – phocoena
  – whales
  – balaenoptera
  – fin whale
  – minke whale
  – beluga whale
  – bowhead whale
  – humpback whale
  – sperm whale
  – chiroptera
  – elephants
  – hyraxes
  – insectivora
  – hedgehogs
  – moles
  – shrews
  – lagomorpha
  – hares
  – rabbits
  – marsupialia
  – macropodidae
  – opossums
  – didelphis
  – monodelphis
  – phalangeridae
  – trichosurus
  – phascolarctidae
  – potoroidae
  – monotremata
  – echidna
  – platypus
  – perissodactyla
  – equidae
  – horses
  – primates
  – haplorhini
  – catarrhini
  – cercopithecidae
  – cercopithecinae
  – cercocebus
  – cercocebus atys
  – cercopithecus
  – cercopithecus aethiops
  – erythrocebus
  – erythrocebus patas
  – macaca
  – macaca fascicularis
  – macaca mulatta
  – macaca nemestrina
  – macaca radiata
  – mandrillus
  – papio
  – papio anubis
  – papio cynocephalus
  – papio hamadryas
  – papio papio
  – papio ursinus
  – theropithecus
  – colobinae
  – colobus
  – hominidae
  – gorilla gorilla
  – humans
  – pan paniscus
  – pan troglodytes
  – pongo pygmaeus
  – hylobatidae
  – hylobates
  – platyrrhini
  – atelidae
  – callitrichidae
  – callimico
  – callithrix
  – leontopithecus
  – saguinus
  – cebidae
  – alouattinae
  – alouatta
  – aotinae
  – aotus trivirgatus
  – cebinae
  – cebus
  – saimirinae
  – saimiri
  – tarsii
  – tarsiidae
  – strepsirhini
  – cheirogaleidae
  – lemuridae
  – lemur
  – lorisidae
  – galago
  – rodentia
  – chinchilla
  – dipodomys
  – gophers
  – guinea pigs
  – mole rats
  – spalax
  – muridae
  – arvicolinae
  – cricetinae
  – cricetulus
  – mesocricetus
  – phodopus
  – gerbillinae
  – murinae
  – mice
  – mice, congenic
  – mice, inbred strains
  – mice, inbred a
  – mice, inbred akr
  – mice, inbred balb c
  – mice, inbred c3h
  – mice, inbred c57bl
  – mice, inbred mdx
  – mice, inbred cba
  – mice, inbred cftr
  – mice, inbred dba
  – mice, inbred hrs
  – mice, inbred icr
  – mice, inbred mrl lpr
  – mice, inbred nod
  – mice, inbred nzb
  – mice, inbred sencar
  – mice, mutant strains
  – mice, biozzi
  – mice, inbred mdx
  – mice, jimpy
  – Knockout mice|mice, knockout
  – mice, neurologic mutants
  – mice, nude
  – mice, obese
  – mice, quaking
  – mice, scid
  – mice, transgenic
  – mice, knockout
  – rats
  – rats, inbred strains
  – rats, inbred aci
  – rats, inbred bb
  – rats, inbred bn
  – rats, inbred buf
  – rats, inbred dahl
  – rats, inbred f344
  – rats, inbred lec
  – rats, inbred lew
  – rats, inbred oletf
  – rats, inbred shr
  – rats, inbred wf
  – rats, inbred wky
  – rats, long-evans
  – rats, mutant strains
  – rats, brattleboro
  – rats, gunn
  – rats, nude
  – rats, zucker
  – rats, sprague-dawley
  – rats, wistar
  – sigmodontinae
  – peromyscus
  – spalax
  – myoxidae
  – octodon
  – porcupines
  – sciuridae
  – marmota
  – scandentia
  – tupaiidae
  – tupaia
  – sirenia
  – dugong
  – trichechus
  – trichechus inunguis
  – trichechus manatus
  – xenarthra
  – armadillos
  – sloths
  – reptiles
  – alligators and crocodiles
  – dinosaurs
  – lizards
  – iguanas
  – snakes
  – boidae
  – colubridae
  – elapidae
  – bungarus
  – cobra
  – hydrophiidae
  – viperidae
  – agkistrodon
  – bothrops
  – crotalus
  – russell's viper
  – trimeresurus
  – turtles

– invertebrates

– annelida
  – leeches
  – hirudo medicinalis
  – oligochaeta
  – polychaeta

– arthropods
  – arachnida
  – acari
  – mites
  – acaridae
  – psoroptidae
  – pyroglyphidae
  – dermatophagoides farinae
  – dermatophagoides pteronyssinus
  – sarcoptidae
  – sarcoptes scabiei
  – tetranychidae
  – trombiculidae
  – ticks
  – argasidae
  – argas
  – ornithodoros
  – ixodidae
  – dermacentor
  – ixodes
  – rhipicephalus
  – rhipicephalus sanguineus
  – scorpions
  – spiders
  – black widow spider
  – crustacea
  – amphipoda
  – anostraca
  – artemia
  – arguloida
  – cladocera
  – daphnia
  – copepoda
  – decapoda (crustacea)
  – anomura
  – astacoidea
  – brachyura
  – crangonidae
  – nephropidae
  – palaemonidae
  – palinuridae
  – pandalidae
  – penaeidae
  – euphausiacea
  – isopoda
  – thoracica
  – horseshoe crabs
  – insects
  – beetles
  – fireflies
  – tenebrio
  – tribolium
  – weevils
  – cockroaches
  – blattellidae
  – periplaneta
  – diptera
  – ceratopogonidae
  – chironomidae
  – culicidae
  – aedes
  – anopheles
  – anopheles gambiae
  – culex
  – ochlerotatus
  – drosophilidae
  – drosophila
  – drosophila melanogaster
  – glossinidae
  – tsetse flies
  – muscidae
  – houseflies
  – psychodidae
  – phlebotomus
  – simuliidae
  – tephritidae
  – ceratitis capitata
  – fleas
  – hemiptera
  – aphids
  – heteroptera
  – cimicidae
  – bedbugs
  – reduviidae
  – triatominae
  – panstrongylus
  – rhodnius
  – triatoma
  – hymenoptera
  – ants
  – bees
  – wasps
  – isoptera
  – lepidoptera
  – butterflies
  – moths
  – bombyx
  – manduca
  – spodoptera
  – lice
  – anoplura
  – pediculus
  – phthirus
  – mallophaga
  – mantodea
  – orthoptera
  – grasshoppers
  – locusta migratoria
  – gryllidae

– bryozoa

– chordata, nonvertebrate
  – hyperotreti
  – hagfishes
  – urochordata
  – ciona intestinalis

– cnidaria
  – anthozoa
  – renilla
  – sea anemones
  – cubozoa
  – hydrozoa
  – hydra
  – scyphozoa
  – sea nettle, east coast

– ctenophora

– echinodermata
  – sea cucumbers
  – cucumaria
  – holothuria
  – stichopus
  – sea urchins
  – anthocidaris
  – arbacia
  – hemicentrotus
  – lytechnius
  – paracentrotus
  – strongylocentrotus
  – strongylocentrotus purpuratus
  – starfish
  – asterias
  – asterina

– helminths
  – acanthocephala
  – moniliformis
  – nematoda
  – adenophorea
  – enoplida
  – dioctophymatoidea
  – mermithoidea
  – trichuroidea
  – capillaria
  – trichinella
  – trichinella spiralis
  – trichuris
  – secernentea
  – ascaridida
  – ascaridoidea
  – anisakis
  – ascaridia
  – ascaris
  – ascaris lumbricoides
  – ascaris suum
  – toxascaris
  – toxocara
  – toxocara canis
  – oxyurida
  – oxyuroidea
  – enterobius
  – rhabditida
  – rhabdiasoidea
  – strongyloides
  – strongyloides ratti
  – strongyloides stercoralis
  – rhabditoidea
  – caenorhabditis
  – caenorhabditis elegans
  – spirurida
  – camallanina
  – dracunculoidea
  – dracunculus nematode
  – spirurina
  – filarioidea
  – brugia
  – brugia malayi
  – brugia pahangi
  – dipetalonema
  – dirofilaria
  – dirofilaria immitis
  – loa
  – mansonella
  – microfilaria
  – onchocerca
  – onchocerca volvulus
  – setaria nematode
  – wuchereria
  – wuchereria bancrofti
  – spiruroidea
  – thelazioidea
  – gnathostoma
  – strongylida
  – ancylostomatoidea
  – ancylostoma
  – necator
  – necator americanus
  – heligmosomatoidea
  – nematospiroides
  – nematospiroides dubius
  – nippostrongylus
  – metastrongyloidea
  – angiostrongylus
  – angiostrongylus cantonensis
  – strongyloidea
  – oesophagostomum
  – strongylus
  – trichostrongyloidea
  – dictyocaulus
  – haemonchus
  – ostertagia
  – trichostrongylus
  – tylenchida
  – tylenchoidea
  – platyhelminths
  – cestoda
  – diphyllobothrium
  – sparganum
  – echinococcus
  – echinococcus granulosus
  – echinococcus multilocularis
  – hymenolepis
  – hymenolepis diminuta
  – hymenolepis nana
  – mesocestoides
  – spirometra
  – sparganum
  – taenia
  – cysticercus
  – taenia saginata
  – taenia solium
  – trematoda
  – dicrocoeliidae
  – dicrocoelium
  – echinostomatidae
  – echinostoma
  – fasciolidae
  – fasciola
  – fasciola hepatica
  – heterophyidae
  – opisthorchidae
  – clonorchis sinensis
  – opisthorchis
  – paramphistomatidae
  – schistosomatidae
  – schistosoma
  – schistosoma haematobium
  – schistosoma japonicum
  – schistosoma mansoni
  – troglotrematidae
  – paragonimus
  – paragonimus westermani
  – turbellaria
  – planarians
  – rotifera

– mollusca
  – bivalvia
  – arcidae
  – scapharca
  – cardiidae
  – corbicula
  – dreissena
  – mercenaria
  – mya
  – mytilidae
  – mytilus
  – mytilus edulis
  – perna
  – ostreidae
  – crassostrea
  – ostrea
  – pectinidae
  – pecten
  – pinctada
  – spisula
  – unionidae
  – anodonta
  – unio
  – cephalopoda
  – decapodiformes
  – loligo
  – sepia
  – nautilus
  – octopodiformes
  – gastropoda
  – aplysia
  – clione
  – conus snail
  – hermissenda
  – pleurobranchaea
  – snails
  – biomphalaria
  – bulinus
  – helix (snails)
  – lymnaea
  – tritonia sea slug
  – polyplacophora

– parasites

– plankton
  – zooplankton

– porifera
  – agelas
  – axinella
  – callyspongia
  – crambe sponge
  – dysidea
  – geodia
  – haliclona
  –petrosia
  – plakortis
  – suberites
  – theonella
  – xestospongia

– protozoa
  – apicomplexa
  – coccidia
  – eimeriida
  – cryptosporidiidae
  – cryptosporidium
  – cryptosporidium parvum
  – eimeriidae
  – cyclospora
  – eimeria
  – eimeria tenella
  – isospora
  – sarcocystidae
  – neospora
  – sarcocystis
  – toxoplasma
  – eucoccidiida
  – haemosporida
  – plasmodium
  – plasmodium berghei
  – plasmodium chabaudi
  – plasmodium cynomolgi
  – plasmodium falciparum
  – plasmodium gallinaceum
  – plasmodium knowlesi
  – plasmodium malariae
  – plasmodium ovale
  – plasmodium vivax
  – plasmodium yoelii
  – piroplasmia
  – piroplasmida
  – babesia
  – babesia bovis
  – babesia microti
  – theileria
  – theileria annulata
  – theileria parva
  – blood-borne pathogens
  – ciliophora
  – kinetofragminophorea
  – trichostomatida
  – trichostomatina
  – balantidium
  – oligohymenophorea
  – hymenostomatida
  – peniculina
  – paramecium
  – paramecium aurelia
  – paramecium caudatum
  – paramecium tetraurelia
  – tetrahymenina
  – tetrahymena
  – tetrahymena pyriformis
  – tetrahymena thermophila
  – polymenophorea
  – hypotrichida
  – sporadotrichina
  – euplotes
  – oxytricha
  – haplosporida
  – myxomycetes
  – physarida
  – physarum
  – physarum polycephalum
  – phytoplankton
  – sarcomastigophora
  – mastigophora
  – phytomastigophorea
  – dinoflagellida
  – pfiesteria piscicida
  – euglenida
  – euglena
  – euglena gracilis
  – volvocida
  – chlamydomonas
  – chlamydomonas reinhardtii
  – zoomastigophora
  – diplomonadida
  – giardia
  – giardia lamblia
  – kinetoplastida
  – trypanosomatina
  – crithidia
  – crithidia fasciculata
  – leishmania
  – leishmania braziliensis
  – leishmania donovani
  – leishmania enriettii
  – leishmania guyanensis
  – leishmania infantum
  – leishmania major
  – leishmania mexicana
  – leishmania tropica
  – trypanosoma
  – trypanosoma brucei brucei
  – trypanosoma brucei gambiense
  – trypanosoma brucei rhodesiense
  – trypanosoma congolense
  – trypanosoma cruzi
  – trypanosoma lewisi
  – trypanosoma vivax
  – trichomonadida
  – dientamoeba
  – trichomonas
  – trichomonas vaginalis
  – tritrichomonas
  – tritrichomonas foetus
  – sarcodina
  – eumycetozoea
  – dictyosteliida
  – dictyostelium
  – physarida
  – physarum
  – physarum polycephalum
  – lobosea
  – amoebida
  – acanthopodina
  – acanthamoeba
  – acanthamoeba castellanii
  – blastocystina
  – blastocystis
  – blastocystis hominis
  – tubulina
  – Amoeba
  – endolimax
  – entamoeba
  – entamoeba histolytica
  – hartmannella
  – schizopyrenida
  – naegleria
  – naegleria fowleri
  – spores
  – spores, protozoan
  – oocysts
  – sporozoites

The list continues at List of MeSH codes (B02).

B01